Anders Iwers (born 6 October 1972) is a Swedish heavy metal musician and bassist of the bands Tiamat and Avatarium. He is the older brother of former In Flames bassist Peter Iwers.

Iwers is a former member of the metal band Dark Tranquillity. He is also the former guitarist of bands Ceremonial Oath (also being the founder), Cemetary, Lacuna Coil, as well as a co-founder and former session musician for In Flames. He did photography on the albums A Moonclad Reflection and Yesterworlds by Dark Tranquillity.

Discography

Ceremonial Oath
Wake the Dead (1990) – demo under Desecrator moniker
Black Sermons (1990) – demo under Desecrator moniker
Promo 1991 (1991) Demo
Lost Name of God (1992)
The Book of Truth (1993)
Carpet (1995)

Cemetary
Black Vanity (1994)
Sundown (1996)

Tiamat
A Deeper Kind of Slumber (1997)
For Her Pleasure (1999) EP
Skeleton Skeletron (1999)
Judas Christ (2002)
Prey (2003)
Amanethes (2008)The Scarred People (2012)

Dark TranquilityAtoma (2016)Moment (2020)

In FlamesLunar Strain (1994) – guest soloist on tracks "In Flames" and "Upon an Oaken Throne"; guitars on 1993 demo tracks

The Awesome MachineUnder the Influence (2002) – guest soloist on "Kick"

RickshawDouble Deluxe (2001) – guest soloist on "Life in Hypercolor"

AvatariumAll I Want (2014)  – bassist on live songsThe Girl With The Raven Mask'' (2015) – bassist on songs "Hypnotized", "Ghostlight" and "The Master Thief"

References

External links 

 
 

Swedish heavy metal musicians
Black metal musicians
1972 births
Living people
21st-century bass guitarists
In Flames members
Ceremonial Oath members
Dark Tranquillity members
Lacuna Coil members